In mathematics, specifically in order theory and functional analysis, a Fréchet  lattice is a topological vector lattice that is also a Fréchet space. 
Fréchet lattices are important in the theory of topological vector lattices.

Properties 

Every Fréchet lattice is a locally convex vector lattice. 
The set of all weak order units of a separable Fréchet lattice is a dense subset of its positive cone.

Examples 

Every Banach lattice is a Fréchet lattice.

See also

References

Bibliography

  
  

Functional analysis